Yesterday, Today, Tomorrow (Filipino: Kahapon, Ngayon, Bukas) is a 2011 Filipino drama film directed by Jun Luna. The film stars Maricel Soriano, Gabby Concepcion, Jericho Rosales, Dennis Trillo, Paulo Avelino, Lovi Poe, Carla Abellana, Solenn Heussaff, Ronaldo Valdez, Agot Isidro and Eula Caballero. It is an official entry for the 2011 Metro Manila Film Festival. It was released on 25 December 2011.

Plot
A story of people and the secrets that tear them apart. It follows a surprising decision that family members make in the aftermath of a tragedy and life changing decisions that will either lead them to a future full of lasting happiness or despair.

Cast
Maricel Soriano as Mariel
Gabby Concepcion as Gary
Jericho Rosales as Jacob
Dennis Trillo as Derek
Paulo Avelino as Vincent
Lovi Poe as Lori
Carla Abellana as Charlotte
Solenn Heussaff as Selene
Ronaldo Valdez as Donald
Agot Isidro as Agnes
Eula Caballero as Eunice
Chariz Solomon as Coreen
Wilma Doesnt as Betty
Via Antonio as Portia
Nadine Samonte as TV Soap Actress
Joem Bascon as TV Soap Actor
Tim Yap as Event Host
Yayo Aguila as Woman Flirting Derek
Lui Villaruz as News Anchor
Hermes Bautista as Vincent's Friend
Manuel Chua as Vincent's Friend
Carmen del Rosario as Maid

Awards

Release

Box office
And as of now, the film earned P18.8 million and still at its place.

References

External links
 

2011 films
2011 drama films
Regal Entertainment films
Philippine drama films